Mick Flavin (born 3 August 1950) is an Irish country singer from Ballinamuck in County Longford. Flavin recorded his first album in Athlone in June 1986. His first big hit being "I'm Gonna Make It After All". Flavin has also recorded "Someday You'll Love Me", from Conway Twitty's album Even Now. 

Flavin's recordings of "Jennifer Johnston & Me" (1989) and "The Waltz Of Angels" (1998) reached number 22 and number 10 respectively in the Irish Singles Chart. In 2005, he was nominated for the International Global Artist Award at the Country Music Association Awards.

Flavin is married and has two sons.

References

External links
 Official site (archived 2020)

Living people
Irish country singers
Irish male singers
Musicians from County Longford
1955 births